The Duluth Beltline Railway, also known as the "West Duluth Incline" or the "Bay View Incline", was first operated in 1889 and operated as a one-car operation until 1892. The Duluth News Tribune wrote an article on May 8, 1890 and called the railway "the longest of its kind in the world." The line had several stations along the route including between Bayview Heights and the Marinette/Iron Bay Works, and on Central Avenue where it met the streetcar tracks.

Statistics

Length:   
Elevation:   
Time:   24 minutes (bottom to top)
Fare:   $0.15($ in  dollars)

See also
7th Avenue West Incline Railway
List of funicular railways

References

External links
 Duluth Incline Railway in MNopedia, the Minnesota Encyclopedia

Transportation in Duluth, Minnesota
Defunct funicular railways in the United States
Defunct Minnesota railroads
1889 establishments in Minnesota
1916 disestablishments in Minnesota